Thomas Joseph Fergus (born June 16, 1962) is an American former professional ice hockey center who played 726 regular season games in the National Hockey League for 12 seasons between 1981 and 1993.

Playing career
Tom Fergus grew up in Montreal, Quebec. As a youth, he played in the 1974 and 1975 Quebec International Pee-Wee Hockey Tournaments with a minor ice hockey team from Pointe-Claire. He later played junior ice hockey for the Peterborough Petes, and was selected 60th overall in the 1980 NHL Entry Draft. He only scored 14 points in his draft year, but found his stride the year following, improving to 43 goals and 88 points.

In 1981–82, Fergus surprisingly made a strong Boston team at the age of just 19, and turned in a fine rookie season with 15 goals and 39 points in 61 games. He quickly evolved into a solid, productive second-line center behind top-line pivot Barry Pederson, and his production jumped to 28 goals and 63 points in 1982–83.

During the 1984 Stanley Cup playoffs, Fergus scored the only two Boston goals in their surprising loss to the Montreal Canadiens in the Adams division semifinal, a best-of-five series that Montreal won in three straight games.

With Pederson injured for much of the 1984–85 campaign, Fergus spent most of the season on Boston's top line, and set career highs with 30 goals and 73 points. He also made his international debut with the United States national team in the 1985 Ice Hockey World Championship tournament in Prague after the Bruins were knocked out in the first round of the Stanley Cup playoffs. However, with Pederson's return the following year along with Ken Linseman Boston was left with three scoring-line centers, and Fergus was dealt to the Toronto Maple Leafs for Bill Derlago.

Fergus immediately became Toronto's top center and set a new career high with 31 goals in 1985–86, as well as matching his career high of 73 points. However, his 1986–87 season was ruined by a viral infection which caused him to miss significant action, although he still produced well when healthy with 49 points in 57 games. He returned to form in 1988–89, registering a career high 45 assists and 67 points, although he drew criticism for his defensive play and his league-worst -38 rating.

Midway through the 1989–90 season, Fergus suffered a serious groin injury which caused him to miss two months of action. Although he returned for the playoffs, the injury lingered and forced him to have surgery early in the 1990–91 campaign. He missed almost the entire season, recording 9 points in just 14 games.

After a poor start to the 1991–92 season, Fergus was placed on waivers and claimed by the Vancouver Canucks. His scoring touch returned with Vancouver, as he scored 14 goals and 34 points in just 44 games, including a number of clutch goals down the stretch. He added 5 goals and 8 points in 13 playoff games. However, he was used as a utility player in a more limited role the following year, and registered 14 points in 36 games.

After being released by Vancouver, Fergus signed in Switzerland with EV Zug and spent two seasons there before retiring in 1995. He finished his career with 235 goals and 346 assists for 581 points in 726 NHL games, along with 499 penalty minutes.

Post career
Fergus now resides in Oakville, Ontario where he is active in the Toronto Maple Leaf alumni association and owns a promotional clothing company, Blue Leaf Limited.

Career statistics

Regular season and playoffs

International

References

External links

Profile at hockeydraftcentral.com

1962 births
Living people
American men's ice hockey centers
Boston Bruins draft picks
Boston Bruins players
Canadian ice hockey centres
EV Zug players
Ice hockey people from Chicago
Ice hockey people from Montreal
Newmarket Saints players
Peterborough Petes (ice hockey) players
Toronto Maple Leafs players
Vancouver Canucks players
Canadian expatriate ice hockey players in Switzerland